Essence ordinaire is the third studio album from French rock group Zebda, released in 1998.

It was their landmark album, containing some of their most popular songs, in particular "Tomber la chemise", which catapulted them to fame and earned them a Victoire de la musique award.

Track listing
"Y'a pas d'arrangement"
"Tomber la chemise"
"Double peine"
"Tombés des nues"
"Quinze ans"
"Je crois que ça va pas être possible"
"Je suis"
"Tout semble si..."
"On est chez nous"
"Oualalaradime"
"Le manouche"
"Né dans la rue"
"Le Petit Robert"

References

External links
Album review by Don Snow of Allmusic

1998 albums
Zebda albums